Alberto A. Llorens (born 24 March 1945) is a sailor from Argentina, who represented his country at the 1984 Summer Olympics in Los Angeles, United States as crew member in the Soling. With helmsman Pedro Ferrero and fellow crew member Carlos Sanguinetti they took the 13th place.

References

External links
 
 
 

1945 births
Living people
Argentine male sailors (sport)
Olympic sailors of Argentina
Sailors at the 1984 Summer Olympics – Soling
South American Champions Soling